Jennifer Frost (born 22 February 1978) is an English singer, television presenter and model. She was a member of girl group Precious before replacing Kerry Katona in the group Atomic Kitten from 2001 until they disbanded in April 2004. Frost returned with the group in 2005, 2006, and 2008 for one-off appearances but chose not to return when the group were invited to appear on ITV2's The Big Reunion in 2012. Original member Katona was asked to come back, and she agreed. Frost presented makeunder show Snog Marry Avoid? from 2008 to 2011. In 2011 she co-presented OK! TV alongside Jeff Brazier. Frost reunited with Atomic Kitten in July 2021.

Biography 
Frost was born in Wallasey, Merseyside and grew up in Prestwich, near Manchester. She loved music from an early age. Her earliest concert experience was when her father took her to a Level 42 concert at the age of nine. Sport and dancing were Frost's favourite activities, however, modelling was her dream. After attending St Monica's High School she started to work for the BBC Television for the Holiday programme and travelling around the world.

Music career

Precious and Atomic Kitten 
Frost started her musical career in 1998 in the group Precious, who were the UK entry at the Eurovision Song Contest 1999, with the song "Say It Again". The song was a top 10 hit in the UK Singles Chart and came twelfth in the contest itself. Subsequent releases by Precious enjoyed only modest success, and their debut album failed to chart at all, ultimately leading the group to go their separate ways by the end of 2000. Frost moved on by replacing Kerry Katona in Atomic Kitten, a girl group founded by OMD frontman Andy McCluskey, in 2001. After the release of their third studio album, Atomic Kitten split in 2004 although reformed in 2005, 2006 and 2008. On 4 March 2012 it was confirmed that Atomic Kitten would reform but was later confirmed that Frost would not be returning to the group and would be replaced by Kerry Katona. Hamilton has since confirmed that Frost would be welcome to rejoin the group in the future. On 6 July 2021, it was announced that Frost would rejoin Atomic Kitten for the release of "Southgate You're the One (Football's Coming Home Again)", a remake of "Whole Again" for the 2020 Euros.

Solo career 
After the split of Atomic Kitten, Frost embarked on a solo career and released her first single "Crash Landing" on 10 October 2005, which peaked at number 47 and thus failed to reach the Top 40. Frost originally recorded the song for the band Route 1, but decided to remake it and shoot a music video for the song which featured her in a spaceship in a pink/purple setting. Frost recorded many other songs in hope of releasing a solo album, "Mirrors" and "Bad Girl", being amongst them, but later said in February 2009 that she did not want to continue as a solo artist.

Other work

Television 
After Atomic Kitten's brief reunion in 2008, Frost stated she wanted to concentrate on a television presenting career. From July 2008, she has presented the very successful BBC Three programme Snog Marry Avoid?. The series returned to BBC Three in February 2009 for a second series and a third series in February 2010. A fourth series aired in early 2011. She competed in Channel 4's former reality series Famous and Fearless in January 2011. From 13–17 and 20 June 2011 she guest co-presented OK! TV on Channel 5, she became a permanent presenter on 15 August, the programme was later axed and last broadcast on 16 December. She appeared on ITV game show The Chase in 2011 and won £14,000 for her chosen charity. She has guest presented LIVE with... on Channel 5.

She appeared on the 2005 edition of I'm a Celebrity...Get Me Out of Here! on the ITV network, where she was eliminated on day 14.

Model 
Frost worked for Storm Model Management and performed various modelling assignments, one of which was being the body of Playboy's underwear range in 2011. That same year, she became the face for Nelsons (Homeopathy) products.

Personal life 
Frost became engaged to DJ Dominic Thrupp in 2002. In September 2007, Frost confirmed on the television show Loose Women that she was pregnant. Her son, Caspar J. Thrupp, was born on 9 October 2007. The wedding was due to take place in January 2010 but was hastily cancelled following the death of Frost's mother Rita from lung cancer. In August 2010, Frost confirmed that she had separated from Thrupp.

Frost's father lived in Spain until his death in September 2017. In August 2011, she married Spanish scuba diving school owner Vicente Juan Spiteri in Ibiza. Their twin daughters, Blake and Nico, were born on 20 January 2013.

Discography

Singles

Other appearances

Filmography

Television

References

External links

 Jenny Frost official website
 

1978 births
Living people
English television personalities
English television presenters
English female models
People from Wallasey
Atomic Kitten members
Precious (band) members
Eurovision Song Contest entrants for the United Kingdom
Eurovision Song Contest entrants of 1999
English women pop singers
English expatriates in Spain
20th-century English women singers
20th-century English singers
21st-century English women singers
21st-century English singers
English Roman Catholics
I'm a Celebrity...Get Me Out of Here! (British TV series) participants